Donald or Don Johnston may refer to:

Donald R. Johnston (1947–1969), American soldier and Medal of Honor recipient
Donald Johnston (rower) (1899–1984), American rower and Olympic gold medalist
Donald Johnston (cricketer) (1894-1918), English cricketer and British Army officer
Don Johnston (1936–2022), Canadian politician and lawyer
Don Johnston (swimmer) (1929–2018), South African swimmer

See also
Don Johnson (disambiguation)
Donald Johnstone (disambiguation)